The Kawaguchi Detachment was an Imperial Japanese Army formation that existed during World War II. Under the command of Major General Kiyotake Kawaguchi, the detachment consisted of the 35th Infantry Brigade and the 124th Infantry Regiment. The detachment operated independently of its parent 18th Division and saw action in several campaigns, including fighting on Borneo, the Philippines and Guadalcanal.

History

Kawaguchi Detachment
At the start of the Burma Campaign of World War II, the Kawaguchi Detachment was based at Camranh Bay, in French Indochina. After embarking on 13 December 1941, three infantry battalions from the Kawaguchi Detachment, as well plus No. 2 Yokosuka Special Naval Landing Force (SNLF), landed almost unopposed at Miri, Seria and Lutong, in northern Borneo, and quickly captured Miri's airfield and oil fields. The detachment, moving by sea, then took Kuching on 23 December. Brunei, Labuan Island, Jesselton, and Tawau were taken in subsequent operations.

On April 10, 1942, one day after the fall of Bataan, the Kawaguchi Detachment landed in Cebu, in the Philippines. The unit was supposed to reinforce the Japanese forces fighting in Bataan but was diverted to Cebu when Bataan’s resistance began to collapse. By May 17, 1942, all organized resistance on the island had ceased and shortly afterward the Kawaguchi Detachment was pulled out and sent to Mindanao. From there they were sent to Guadalcanal.

By September 4 the bulk of the Kawaguchi Force (including the Aoba Detachment's three infantry battalions from the 2nd Division) had landed on Guadalcanal. On the night of the September 13 Kawaguchi's forces, involving the main force of the Kawaguchi Detachment (about five infantry battalions) and the remainder of the Ichiki Detachment (about 100 men), assaulted the U.S. Marine defenses around Henderson Field. A series of unsuccessful frontal attacks were undertaken by the Japanese forces over several hours while confusion gripped the fighting lines. A second effort was made later, during which part of the Detachment penetrated a corner of the airfield, but it was unable to hold on to its gains after American reserves were committed and a heavy bombardment was unleashed. Kawaguchi's forces were defeated with heavy losses and forced to retreat from the battlefield. Kawaguchi was subsequently relieved of command during the Japanese preparations for the Battle for Henderson Field in October, 1942 and he was eventually evacuated from the island.

35th Independent Mixed Brigade
The brigade was reactivated on 10 February 1944 in Tokyo and stationed at the Andaman Islands under Lieutenant General Yoshihisa Inoue. Inoue was reassigned to command the 94th Division and replaced on 23 May 1945 by Major General Noboru Sato.

See also
Independent Mixed Brigades (Imperial Japanese Army)

Notes

References

External links
  1941 Infantry Division (square) 8 December 1941 See note (2)
 HIJMS KINU: Tabular Record of Movement

Detachment, Kawaguchi